Emilio E. Huyke Coliseum (Spanish: Coliseo Emilio E. Huyke) is an indoor sporting arena located in Humacao, Puerto Rico. The coliseum is named after sports writer and former Secretary of the Puerto Rico Olympic Committee, Emilio E. Huyke.

The coliseum's seating capacity is 1,500 seats. It is used mostly for Volleyball and basketball as the home arena of the Caciques de Humacao.

It is named after Emilio Huyke, a sports journalist and administrator from Humacao.

External links
Coliseo Emilio E. Huyke
Baloncesto Superior Nacional

Humacao, Puerto Rico
Indoor arenas in Puerto Rico
Basketball venues in Puerto Rico